Universal waste is a category of waste materials designated as "hazardous waste", but containing materials that are very common.

Universal waste includes:

 Batteries; lithium, Silver ion, nickel cadmium (Ni-Cad), mercury-oxide, or sealed lead-acid. Spent Lead-Acid Batteries being reclaimed do not need to be managed as universal waste.
 Pesticides; Stocks of a suspended and canceled pesticide that are part of a voluntary or mandatory recall
 Mercury Containing Equipment;  a device or part of a device (including thermostats) that contains elemental mercury integral to its function. 
 Lamps; include, but are not limited to, fluorescent, high intensity discharge, neon, mercury vapor, high pressure sodium, and metal halide lamps.

Businesses and other generators of such waste are required to provide for their proper disposal.

References 
 

Waste